Rip Curl Search formerly known as Rip Curl Search or Rip Curl Pro Search, is a professional surfing competition of the WSL World Tour which took place every year in October and November always in some places around the world, seeking to take the ASP World Tour to new locations and expand surfing. The event was first founded in 2005 as Rip Curl Search.

Dispute Locations 
During the years the Rip Curl Search passed through some places in the world. This is a list of where events took place.

Naming 

Since the birth of this competition it had 2 different names.

Winners

See also 
 World Surf League
Supertubos

References

External links 
 Rip Curl Search

World Surf League
Surfing competitions